These are the New Territories West results of the 2016 Hong Kong Legislative Council election. The election was held on 4 September 2016 and all 9 seats in New Territories West, which consists of Tsuen Wan District, Tuen Mun District, Yuen Long District, Kwai Tsing District and Islands District, were contested. Veteran social activist Eddie Chu received the highest votes of 84,121, 14 per cent of the vote share, in all geographical constituencies. The Democratic Party retook one seat after it was ousted in the previous election with newcomer Andrew Wan, while independent lawyer Junius Ho who was backed by the Liaison Office won the last seat by defeating pro-democracy heavyweight Labour Party's Lee Cheuk-yan. Localist group Civic Passion's Cheng Chung-tai also won the only seat for the CP–PPI–HKRO electoral alliance.

Overall results
Before election:

Change in composition:

Candidates list

Opinion polling

See also
Legislative Council of Hong Kong
Hong Kong legislative elections
2016 Hong Kong legislative election

References

Elections in Hong Kong
2016 Hong Kong legislative election